Kushk-e Mehdi (also Romanized as Kūshk-e Mehdī; also known as Kūtoshk-e Mehdī) is a village in Tus Rural District, in the Central District of Mashhad County, Razavi Khorasan Province, Iran. At the 2006 census, its population was 3,118, in 729 families.

References 

Populated places in Mashhad County